Jürgen Glowacz (born 30 September 1952) is a German former footballer who played as a midfielder. He spent 11 seasons in the Bundesliga with 1. FC Köln, SV Werder Bremen and Bayer 04 Leverkusen. He is a vice-president of 1. FC Köln.

Honours
1. FC Köln
 Bundesliga: 1977–78; runner-up 1972–73
 DFB-Pokal: 1976–77, 1977–78; finalist 1972–73

References

External links
 

Living people
1952 births
Association football midfielders
German footballers
1. FC Köln players
1. FC Köln II players
SV Werder Bremen players
Bayer 04 Leverkusen players
Bundesliga players
Footballers from Cologne